Angelo Rossetto (11 March 1946 – 14 January 2022) was an Italian rower. He competed in the men's coxless four event at the 1972 Summer Olympics. Rossetto died in Silea on 14 January 2022, at the age of 75.

References

External links

1946 births
2022 deaths
Italian male rowers
Olympic rowers of Italy
Rowers at the 1972 Summer Olympics
People from Latina, Lazio
Sportspeople from the Province of Latina